For Us the Living: The Medgar Evers Story is a 1983 American made-for-television biographical film based on the 1967 book, For Us, the Living, by Myrlie Evers-Williams and William Peters. It was broadcast on the PBS television program American Playhouse on March 22, 1983.

Plot
Howard Rollins stars as the assassinated NAACP civil rights activist Medgar Evers, while Irene Cara co-stars as his wife (and future NAACP chairperson) Myrlie. The film concentrates on Medgar Evers, an ex-insurance agent turned activist, in the final years of his life as the first NAACP field secretary in Mississippi. In 1954, he is involved in a boycott against white merchants and was instrumental in eventually desegregating the University of Mississippi in 1962. His home in Jackson, Mississippi is besieged by bigots, and he and his family are threatened with dire consequences. Myrtle Evers with her children were often at home alone when fire bombs and bricks were thrown against their home and through their windows.  However, The Everses continued to work towards the goal of integrating the racially polarized. Medgar Evers truly believed The Constitution to include the rights within were for each American citizen, no matter color, age, class or education. On June 12, 1963, the 37-year-old Medgar Evers is shot to death in front of his home by white supremacist Byron De La Beckwith.

Cast

 Location: The scene where Medgar Evers solicit community leaders and community members to sign the first petition, actually was filmed in an Atlanta, Georgia Church Located on 470 Whitehall Street: Denson Temple  Peoples Free Methodist Church. 
 The Cast Member Selema Perry Berry was a member of Denson Temple Peoples Free Methodist Church as Superintendent of Sunday School. She sat on the back row with her Pastor Rev. James Brown.

Awards

See also
 Civil rights movement in popular culture

References

External links
  
 
 

1983 television films
1983 films
African-American films
American Playhouse
American television films
Civil rights movement in television
Films about race and ethnicity
Films scored by Gerald Fried
Films set in the 1960s
Films set in Mississippi
Films directed by Michael Schultz